The name Anika has been used for two tropical cyclones in the Australian region.

Cyclone Anika (2008) – a Category 2 tropical cyclone that affected the Cocos (Keeling) Islands.
Cyclone Anika (2022) – a Category 2 tropical cyclone that made landfall twice on Western Australia.

Australian region cyclone set index articles